Raja Rajeshwari Nagar is a residential suburb of Mysore city in the state of Karnataka of the nation of India and is located in the Greater Bhogadi area of the city.

Location
Raja Rajeshwari Nagar is located to the west of Mysore city, immediately outside the ring road.

Demographics
Raja Rajeshwari Nagar is a predominantly Hindu locality. Most of the houses are newly constructed, as this is a newly developed layout. This locality comes outside the ring road encircling Mysore, but is considered part of the city. Bus number 69 goes to this locality.

Landmarks

 P. K. V. Acharya Sabha Bhavana
 Sara Convention Circle
 Christ Public School
 Hari Vidyalaya
 Natya Samskrithi Kalani Kendra
 Rainbow Public School
 Bhairaveshwara Function Hall
 Euro Kids School

Suburbs and Layouts
 Somanath Nagar
 Dattagalli Layout
 Adhithya Circle
 Kergalli Layout
 Railway Layout
 Nivedhitha Nagar
 CFTRI Layout

Image Gallery

See also
 Bhogadi

References

Suburbs of Mysore